The Circuito de Monsanto, or Monsanto Park Circuit, was a  race track in Monsanto Forest Park, near Lisbon, Portugal which hosted the Portuguese Grand Prix.

Built on parklands, the circuit was considered difficult to drive because it crossed so many different types of surfaces, including tramlines at one point. The track hosted numerous races from 1954 to 1959, but only one race qualified as a Formula One event: the 1959 Portuguese Grand Prix, won by Stirling Moss. He won the race in the twilight hours, since the race was purposely started late in the day to avoid the intense late summer sun.

See also
Monsanto Forest Park
1959 Portuguese Grand Prix

External links 

 Monsanto Park Circuit at All Formula One Info

Formula One circuits
Portuguese Grand Prix
Motorsport venues in Portugal
Defunct motorsport venues
Sports venues completed in 1954